The 2000 end-of-year tests, known in the northern hemisphere as the 2000 Autumn Internationals, was a series of international rugby union matches played in November and December 2000. The hosts were Six Nations Championship countries England, France, Ireland, Italy, Scotland, Wales, and Southern Hemisphere side Argentina. Argentina also participated as a touring side, along with Australia, Canada, Japan, New Zealand, Romania, Samoa, South Africa and the USA.

France and New Zealand contested the Dave Gallaher Trophy for the first time, in a two-match series. New Zealand took a 1–0 series lead in the first match at the Stade de France in Paris, with France levelling the series after a 42–33 win in Marseille – the first ever test match in the Stade Vélodrome. New Zealand won the trophy on account of their higher aggregate score over the two matches.

The match between England and Australia saw the Six Nations champions play the Tri-Nations champions. England won thanks to an injury-time try by Dan Luger, and claimed the Cook Cup for the first time. It was England's first victory over Australia in the professional era.

Days later, England's players went on strike over a dispute with the Rugby Football Union over pay. This nearly led to coach Clive Woodward selecting a second-choice squad for the following weekend's match against Argentina, but the disagreement was ultimately resolved and the strike ended in time for the affected players to be selected.

Matches

Week 1

First test match between Scotland and the United States.

Week 2

Australia retain the Hopetoun Cup.

Week 3

England win the Cook Cup.

Series drawn 1–1. New Zealand won the inaugural Dave Gallaher Trophy.

Week 4

Week 5

References

2000
2000–01 in European rugby union
2000 in Oceanian rugby union
2000 in North American rugby union
2000 in South American rugby union
2000 in South African rugby union
2000–01 in Japanese rugby union